German submarine U-400 was a Type VIIC U-boat of Nazi Germany's Kriegsmarine during World War II.

The submarine was laid down on 18 November 1942 at the Howaldtswerke yard in Kiel as yard number 32, launched on 8 January 1944 and commissioned on 18 March under the command of Kapitänleutnant Horst Creutz.

Design
German Type VIIC submarines were preceded by the shorter Type VIIB submarines. U-400 had a displacement of  when at the surface and  while submerged. She had two shafts and two  propellers.

U-400 was fitted with five  torpedo tubes (four fitted at the bow and one at the stern), fourteen torpedoes, one  SK C/35 naval gun, (220 rounds), one  Flak M42 and two twin  C/30 anti-aircraft guns. The boat had a complement of between forty-four and sixty.

Service history
After training with the 5th U-boat Flotilla, U-400 was attached to the 11th U-boat Flotilla for front-line service on 1 November 1944.

The U-boat sailed from Horten Naval Base in Norway for her first war patrol on 15 November 1944, and headed for the waters off Land's End. Despite repeated requests for reports by the German U-boat Command, none were received. The U-boat was eventually listed as "missing" at the end of January 1945. After the war, the Allies attributed the loss of U-400 to a depth charge attack by the frigate  on 17 December 1944, about  SE of Kinsale, Ireland.

Discovery
All three submarines were sunk in the Bristol Channel by a deep-trap minefield.

The U-boat sunk by Nyasaland is now believed to have been .

Previously recorded fate
U-400 was noted as sunk in mid-December 1944 in the British minefield 'HX A1' off the Cornish coast.

References

Bibliography

External links

German Type VIIC submarines
U-boats commissioned in 1944
U-boats sunk in 1944
U-boats sunk by mines
World War II submarines of Germany
1944 ships
Ships built in Kiel
Ships lost with all hands
World War II shipwrecks in the Atlantic Ocean
Maritime incidents in December 1944